James A. Dick IV (born October 22, 1957) is an American professional racing driver and businessman. He is the proprietor of the El Paso, Texas-based Viva Autosport chain of car dealerships, has driven in the NASCAR SuperTruck Series, and formerly owned the NASCAR Nationwide Series team Viva Motorsports.

Business career
Coming from a family of businessmen, Dick bought his first car dealership in El Paso, Texas in 1985. By 2007, Dick owned six new car dealerships and three used car dealerships, and rebranded all of the dealerships under a new Viva Autosport name. By 2016, that number had grown to 13 and the Viva chain of dealerships had expanded to New Mexico.

He later owned and sponsored a NASCAR Nationwide Series team, Viva Motorsports, which ran entries for Dick's son, Jamie Dick.

Racing career
After participating in a 1988 charity race at El Paso Speedway Park, Dick decided to become a sprint car racer, only to decide against it some time later due to safety risks and a lack of advancement opportunities. He ran a limited schedule in the NASCAR Winston West Series in 1994, hoping to use that experience as a springboard to running some NASCAR Winston Cup Series races in 1995 or 1996. In 1995, Dick ran three NASCAR SuperTruck Series races, scoring a best finish of 17th at Colorado National Speedway.

Personal life
Dick was previously married, but divorced his wife.

Motorsports career results

NASCAR
(key) (Bold – Pole position awarded by qualifying time. Italics – Pole position earned by points standings or practice time. * – Most laps led.)

SuperTruck Series

Winston West Series

References

Living people
1957 births
Racing drivers from Texas
Businesspeople from Texas
Racing drivers from El Paso, Texas
Sportspeople from El Paso, Texas
NASCAR drivers